Bromley is a large town in Greater London, England, within the London Borough of Bromley.

Originally part of Kent, Bromley became a market town, chartered in 1158. Its location on a coaching route and the opening of a railway station in 1858 were key to its development and the shift from an agrarian village to an urban town. As part of the suburban growth of London in the 20th century, Bromley significantly increased in population and was  incorporated as a municipal borough in 1903 and became part of the London Borough of Bromley in 1965. Bromley today forms a major retail and commercial centre. It is identified in the London Plan as one of the 13 metropolitan centres of Greater London.

History
Bromley is first recorded in an Anglo-Saxon charter of 862 as Bromleag and means 'woodland clearing where broom grows'. It shares this Old English etymology with Great Bromley in eastern Essex, but not with the Bromley in the East End of London.

The history of Bromley is closely connected with the See of Rochester. In AD 862 Ethelbert, the King of Kent, granted land to form the Manor of Bromley. In 1185 Bromley Palace was built by Gilbert Glanvill, Bishop of Rochester. Pilgrims came to the town to visit St. Blaise's Well. The Palace was held by the Bishops until 1845, when Coles Child, a wealthy local merchant and philanthropist, purchased Bromley Palace (now the hub of the Bromley Civic Centre) and became lord of the manor. The town was an important coaching stop on the way to Hastings from London, and the now defunct Royal Bell Hotel (just off Market Square) is referred to in Jane Austen's Pride and Prejudice. It was a quiet rural village until the arrival of the railway in 1858 in Shortlands, which led to rapid growth, and outlying suburban districts such as Bickley (which later overflowed into Bromley Common) were developed to accommodate those wishing to live so conveniently close to London.

Bromley, also known as Bromley St Peter and St Paul, formed an ancient parish in the Bromley and Beckenham hundred and the Sutton-at-Hone lathe of Kent. In 1840 it became part of the expanded Metropolitan Police District. The parish adopted the Local Government Act 1858 and a local board was formed in 1867. The board was reconstituted as Bromley Urban District Council in 1894 and the parish became Bromley Urban District. It formed part of the London Traffic Area from 1924 and the London Passenger Transport Area from 1933. Bromley became part of the newly created Greater London in 1965, in the new London Borough of Bromley.

Governance

Bromley forms part of the Bromley and Chislehurst Parliament constituency. The current MP is Bob Neill. Peter Fortune is the London Assembly member for the Bexley and Bromley constituency, in which the town is located.

Bromley's most prominent MP was the former Conservative prime minister, Harold Macmillan.

Climate
Climate in this area has mild differences between highs and lows.  The Köppen Climate Classification subtype for this climate is "Cfb". (Marine West Coast Climate/Oceanic climate).

Economy

Bromley is one of the major metropolitan centres identified in the London Plan. Bromley had one of the highest gross disposable household incomes (GDHI) in the UK, at £27,169 in 2018.

Bromley was ranked fourth in Greater London by Retail Footprint in 2005, behind the West End, Croydon and Kingston upon Thames. Bromley competes with both Croydon and the Bluewater centre in Dartford as a shopping destination.

Bromley High Street 
The town has a large retail area, including a pedestrianised High Street and The Glades centre, the main shopping mall, which has a catchment of 1.3 million people. The shopping area includes retailers such as Gap, Oasis, Russell & Bromley and Waterstone's, whilst the restaurants includes a branch of the small chain of Belgian-themed Belgo restaurants. Development at the nearby St. Mark's Square has seen further restaurants and a cinema established.

Bromley High Street is also the location for the Bromley Charter Market, which runs on a Tuesday, Thursday and Saturday. King John granted a charter for the Market to be held every Tuesday in 1205, with Henry VI revising this charter to every Thursday in 1447. The Market sells food and confectionery items, clothing and other goods like jewellery.

Transport

Rail
The town's main station is Bromley South station, served by Southeastern services to London Victoria (non stop express services, semi fast services via Denmark Hill and stopping services via Herne Hill), Kentish Town via Catford and London Blackfriars, Orpington, Sevenoaks via Swanley, Ramsgate via Chatham, Dover Priory via Chatham & Canterbury East and Canterbury West via Maidstone East & Ashford International. Bromley North station also connects the town with Southeastern shuttle services to Grove Park, where connections can be made for services to London Charing Cross & London Cannon Street via Lewisham.

Buses
Bromley is served by London Buses routes 61, 119, 126, 138, 146, 162, 208, 227, 246, 261, 269, 314, 320, 336, 352, 354, 358, 367, N3 & N199. These connect it with areas including Beckenham, Bexleyheath, Biggin Hill, Catford, Chislehurst, Croydon, Crystal Palace, Eltham, Grove Park, Lewisham, Mottingham, New Addington, Orpington, Penge, Sidcup, West Wickham & Westerham.

Culture

Festivals 
Since May 1929 Bromley has had an annual festival of "dance, drama and comedy" in around the towns venues

The large open spaces have lent them themselves to outdoor concerts, festivals and outdoor screenings as well in the venues such as Norman park, Hayes farm, Beckenham Place Park and Croydon Road recreation ground.

Theatres
Bromley has a number of theatres in the borough, in the town centre there are three, a professional, the Churchill Theatre, an amateur, the Bromley Little Theatre (close to Bromley North railway station) and an outdoor amphitheatre located in "Church House Gardens" behind the Churchill theatre.

The Churchill Theatre was opened on 19 July 1977 by the Prince of Wales, and seats 781. It is run on a contract currently held by HQ Theatres Ltd acting as both a receiving and producing house, with productions transferring to the West End or touring nationally. An example being recent tours of Club Tropicana The Musical.

Library 
Bromley also has a central library in the same building as the Churchill Theatre with a large book stock, Internet and wifi access, reference library and local studies department. It functions as the central library of the broader Bromley Borough Libraries Service.

Cinema 
Bromley Picturehouse was opened in June 2019 in the previous Empire theatre.

Vue Cinemas own a  nine-screen cinema, which is part of the Bromley South Central scheme at St Mark's Square, opened on 28 November 2018.

Dance 

Bromley has its own team of Morris dancers, The Ravensbourne Morris Men, founded in 1947 as a post war revival team following an inaugural meeting at the then Jean's Café, which was located opposite Bromley South Station.

Civic Society 

Bromley Civic Society is a civic society for the historic centre of Bromley. It is a founder member of Civic Voice. It seeks to educate the public about the community's history and to preserve historical sites.

Popular culture

In the famous Monty Python "Spam" sketch Bromley was stated to be the location of the fictional Green Midget Café, where every item on the menu was composed of spam in varying degrees. In another Monty Python sketch, it was stated that all seven continents are visible from the top of the Kentish Times building in Bromley.

The Bromley Contingent was the name given to the entourage that followed the Sex Pistols and helped popularise the punk movement. It was so called because many of its members were from Bromley, some of whom later became famous as musicians in their own right, like Siouxsie Sioux and Billy Idol.

The 2018 humorous film, The Bromley Boys is set in Bromley and surroundings in the late 1960s and early 1970s. Based on a real-life memoir by Dave Roberts about following Bromley F.C., it includes many scenes filmed locally, although Crockenhill F.C. was used as a substitute for the Hayes Lane stadium.

Guitarist Billy Jenkins, born in Bromley, released an album titled "Sounds like Bromley" in 1982 and another in 1997 titled "Still Sounds Like Bromley". In a BBC Radio 3 interview he said that "if Kent is the Garden of England then Bromley is one of the compost heaps". He then moved to Lewisham.

Media
Local news is provided by the Bromley Times.

Sport and leisure
The town has four Non-League football clubs. Two teams play their home games at the Hayes Lane Stadium: Bromley F.C. and Cray Wanderers F.C.; the latter is claimed to be the oldest football club in what is today Greater London. The other teams, Holmesdale F.C. and Greenwich Borough F.C., play at Oakley Road. Bromley F.C. are the only professional team  in Bromley and play in the National League, one level below the Football League.

Four rugby clubs in Bromley are, Old Elthamians a National League 2 side, Parkhouse FC, Bromley RFC and Beckenham RFC. Beccehamians RFC is a club that was founded in 1933 which plays competitive rugby at Sparrows Den at the bottom of Corkscrew Hill in nearby West Wickham.

Education

Bromley has numerous schools, and is home to Bromley College of Further & Higher Education.
There are two specialist Media Arts Schools, Hayes School and The Ravensbourne School. Bishop Justus School is a specialist Music College. It also has the Ravens Wood and Darrick Wood Schools. There are many independent schools within the London Borough of Bromley, including Eltham College (in the nearby area of Mottingham – within the borough of Bromley and near the London Borough of Lewisham) and Bromley High (situated in the nearby area of Bickley - also within the borough of Bromley).

Demography
Bromley town as a whole, including its neighbourhoods and villages, is formed of six wards: Bickley; Bromley Common and Keston; Bromley Town; Hayes and Coney Hall; Plaistow and Sundridge; and Shortlands. Together they had a population of 87,889 in the 2011 UK census, whereas the borough overall had a population 331,096.

The life expectancy in Bromley Town ward (which covers the town centre) was 79.3 years for males and 83.7 years for females, during 2009–2013. The highest in the town were in Shortlands: 86.1 years for males and 88.1 years for females. The lowest for both genders was in Plaistow and Sundridge: 77.5 and 82.1 years respectively.

In Bromley Town, 18.5% of the population was of minority ethnicity. The highest in the town was 19.3% in Plaistow and Sundridge, and the lowest was 8.3% in Hayes and Coney Hall.

The median house price in Bromley Town ward was £327,000 in 2014, compared to £295,444 in Plaistow and Sundridge, and £480,000 in Bickley. 37% of houses in Bickley were detached, more than other wards. In all wards, over 60% of houses were owned by households, peaking at 88.2% in Hayes and Coney Hall. In 2020, the average cost of a house was £519,619

Landmarks

The parish church of St Peter and St Paul stands on Church Road. It was largely destroyed by German bombing on 16 April 1941 and rebuilt in the 1950s incorporating the medieval tower and reusing much of the flint and fragments of the original stone building. The most noteworthy historic building is Bromley College, London Road. The central public open spaces are; Queen's Gardens, Martin's Hill, Church House Gardens, Library Gardens and College Green.

Another parish church in Bromley is St Mark's, which stands on Westmoreland Road. The present church is the third. The first was built as a temporary iron church in 1884 to cope with Bromley's growing population, on land slightly to the east of the present church, donated by a local man called Eley Soames. The road name St Mark's Road preserves the rough location of the former site.

The second church was built in brick and stone on the present site, and designed by Evelyn Hellicar, son of the then vicar of St Peter and St Paul's. It was completed in 1898 in the Perpendicular Gothic style and consecrated by William Walsh, Bishop of Dover, on 22 October that year. The tower, though, was not completed until 1904. Like St Peter and St Paul's, St Mark's was heavily damaged in the London Blitz of 1941. Only the tower survived intact.

On 3 June 1952, the Duchess of Kent laid the foundation stone of the present church, which was designed by T W G Grant and built by David Nye. Besides the tower, other parts of the fabric of the original church were used in the rebuilding. Inside there are some interesting monuments: to Samuel Ajayi Crowther, John Cole Patteson and Vedanayagam Samuel Azariah, who were all bishops in the Commonwealth.

The East Street drill hall was completed in 1872.

Notable residents

H. G. Wells
Noted author H. G. Wells was born in Bromley on 21 September 1866, to Sarah and Joseph Wells; his father was the founder of the Bromley Cricket Club and the proprietor of a shop that sold cricket equipment. Wells spent the first 13 years of his life in Bromley. From 1874 to 1879 he attended Tomas Morley's Bromley Academy, at 74 High Street. There was a 'H. G. Wells Centre' in Masons Hill near the southern end of the High Street which housed the Bromley Labour Club (the building was demolished in 2017). In August 2005, the wall honouring Wells in Market Square was repainted; the current wall painting features a rich green background with the same Wells reference and the evolutionary sequence of Homo sapiens featured in Origin of Species by Charles Darwin, a former resident of nearby Downe Village.

Wells wrote about Bromley in an early unsigned article in the Pall Mall Gazette in which he expressed satisfaction that he had been born in an earlier, more rural Bromley.  A blue plaque marks Wells' birthplace in Market Square, on the wall of what is now a Primark store. A marble plaque appears above the door of 8 South Street, the location of Mrs Knott's Dame school where "Bertie", as he was called as a child, learned to read and write. H. G. Wells featured Bromley in two of his novels: The War in the Air (which refers to Bromley as Bunhill) and The New Machiavelli (in which Bromley is referred to as Bromstead).

However, H. G. Wells refused the offered freedom of the town, stating:

"Bromley has not been particularly gracious to me nor I to Bromley and I don't think I want to add the freedom of Bromley to the freedom of the City of London and the freedom of the City of Brussels – both of which I have."

He described Bromley in one of his novels as a "morbid sprawl of population".

Other residents
Owen Chadwick was born in Bromley in 1916. He was awarded the Order of Merit, was Vice Chancellor of University of Cambridge, Master of Selwyn Cambridge, Regius Professor of Modern History, Dixie Professor of Ecclesiastical History, Chancellor of University of Anglia, President of the British Academy, and was a Rugby Union International.

Other world-famous authors who hail from Bromley include Captain W.E. Johns (author of the Biggles adventures), David Nobbs (author of The Fall and Rise of Reginald Perrin and writer for Les Dawson and The Two Ronnies), and Enid Blyton who wrote influential children's fiction such as the Secret Seven and Famous Five stories. A blue historical plaque can be found on the external wall of her former home on Shortlands Road, Bromley.

Other famous people who lived in Bromley include David Bowie, Charles Darwin, Talbot Rothwell, screenwriter of twenty Carry On films, Justine Lord, actress, Peter Howitt, Richmal Crompton, Pixie Lott, Matt Terry, Christopher Tennant,  Hanif Kureishi, Peter Frampton, Aleister Crowley, bassist Steven Severin of Siouxsie and the Banshees, Fatboy Slim, Jack Dee, Tom Allen, Rob Beckett, Gary Rhodes, Pete Sears, singer Poly Styrene, Billy Idol, Josh Beech, Ruthie Henshall, Trevor Goddard, actor, Billy Jenkins, Alex Clare, cricketer Jill Cruwys, the anarchist Peter Kropotkin, the former Clash drummer Topper Headon, illustrator Charles Keeping, Formula 1 test driver Gary Paffett, IndyCar driver Mike Conway, children's writer Andrew Murray, tenor Roland Cunningham, actor Michael York who attended Bromley Grammar School for Boys, clarinetist Chris Craker, Don Perrin, Canadian author who attended Burnt Ash School in Bromley, and Sir Thomas James Harper, an officer decorated in the Crimean War. The musical conducting brothers Stephen and Nicholas Cleobury were born in Bromley. Actor Jerome Flynn, who starred in Game of Thrones as Bronn, was born in Bromley. Gus Lobban and Jamie Bulled of the band Kero Kero Bonito grew up in Bromley: their music video for the song 'You Know How It Is' features several local landmarks.

Deborah Linsley, the victim of one of Britain's most high-profile unsolved murders in 1988, grew up in Bromley.

Richard Reid, also known as the "Shoe Bomber", was born and lived in Bromley. He is notable as the suspect for the 2001 shoe bomb attempt.

In the 20th century, the Parish Church of St Peter and St Paul produced, in quick succession, three Church of England Bishops: Henry David Halsey – Bishop of Carlisle, Philip Goodrich – Bishop of Worcester, David Bartleet – Bishop of Tonbridge. Sculptor Nicholas Cornwell and Maisy James the Big Brother 12 housemate.  Sometime before 1881 the engineer and industrialist Richard Porter moved to Beckenham where he remained until his death in 1913. Hanif Kureishi, the writer and filmmaker was born here, and spent a significant part of his youth, here. His first novel The Buddha of Suburbia was loosely based on his life here and the people he lived and met here.

Comedian Frankie Boyle claims to be a former resident and has described Bromley as a 'lobotomy made out of bricks'. The comedian Chris Addison currently lives in Bromley, as does tennis player Emma Raducanu.

West Ham United F.C. midfielder Gary O'Neil, former Millwall F.C. midfielder Tim Cahill, and former Blackburn Rovers striker Jason Roberts lived in Bromley. English darts player Les Capewell was born in Bromley.

Scottish education secretary Michael Russell MSP was born and spent the early years of his life in Bromley.

See also
 Bromley Civic Society

References

Further reading

External links

Areas of London
Districts of the London Borough of Bromley
Market towns in London
Metropolitan centres of London
Former civil parishes in the London Borough of Bromley